Evermore Darkly... is an EP by the British extreme metal band Cradle of Filth, released in October 2011. A companion piece to the 2010 album Darkly, Darkly, Venus Aversa, it contains two new tracks in "Transmission from Hell" and "Thank Your Lucky Scars", plus demo versions of some Venus Aversa tracks. An orchestral version of "Summer Dying Fast" (a track from 1994's The Principle of Evil Made Flesh album, reworked previously for 2001's Bitter Suites to Succubi) is also included as a taster for the subsequent Midnight in the Labyrinth collection. The CD was originally packaged with a DVD containing a documentary, a live show from 25 June 2011's Graspop festival ("Burning Down Graspop"), and the promo video for "Lilith Immaculate".

Track listing

Personnel

Cradle of Filth
 Dani Filth – vocals
 Paul Allender – lead guitar
 James McIlroy – rhythm guitar
 Dave Pybus – bass
 Martin "Marthus" Škaroupka – drums, further orchestration on "Lilith Immaculate" (extended length)
 Caroline Campbell - keyboards (live)

Additional personnel
 Mark Newby-Robson – orchestration on "Thank Your Lucky Scars"
 Doug Bradley – narration on "Transmission from Hell"
 Ralph Woodward – choir conductor & arranger
 Dora Kemp, Chitra Ramalingam, Philippa Mann, Anna Asbach-Cullen, Emma Levy, Nikki Cutts, Steve Mullock, Chris Young, Andrew Kennedy, Tim Cutts, Nick Webb, John Aldridge – choir on "Summer Dying Fast"

Production
Scott Atkins - producer, engineer, mixing
Mark Harwood - engineer
Doug Cook - mixing of Elder version songs and of "Summer Dying Fast"
Rob Caggiano, Paul Logus - mixing of "Forgive Me Father (I'm in a Trance)"
Kit Woolven - mixing of "Summer Dying Fast"
Ross Bolidai - Rocumentary producer and director, "Lilith Immaculate" video director
Heather Snell - "Lilith Immaculate" producer
Natalie Shau - cover art

Charts

References

2011 albums
Cradle of Filth albums
Nuclear Blast albums
Peaceville Records albums